, headquartered in Saga and Tokyo, is a Japanese multinational pharmaceutical corporation that develops and markets prescription and over-the-counter drug (OTC) products, especially external pain relieving products such as the transdermal patch. Hisamitsu has specialised in transdermal drug delivery system technology (TDDS) since the introduction of its original line of patches in 1903.

Its Salonpas brand of products are exported to over fifty countries. Hisamitsu also manufactures the Mohrus and Mohrus-Tape line of external pain relief prescription products for the Japanese drug market. The company also manufactures internal medicines, eye drops for general application and the Lifecella Face Mask, a skin-care product. Hisamitsu has developed the only over-the-counter transdermal patches approved by the U.S Food and Drug Administration (FDA).

History
Hisamitsu Pharmaceutical was founded in 1847 under the name of Komatsuya. It was established in present-day Tosu, Saga, which borders the prefectures of Saga and Fukuoka on the island of Kyushu. This region is well known in Japan for a tradition of herbal medicines. The prototype of its Salonpas patch line was created through the application of asahi mankinko, a poultice consisting of rubbing ointment pasted on Japanese paper, in 1903. The Salonpas product line, which was developed from this more traditional remedy, was introduced in 1934 and first exported to overseas markets in 1937.

A subsidiary branch was opened in Republic of China (Taiwan) in 1960. In 1975 a joint company was established in Indonesia. More subsidiaries followed in Brazil (Hisamitsu Farmaceutica do Brasil Ltda.) in 1986, in Singapore (Hisamitsu Pharmaceutical Singapore Pte. Ltd.), in Adventure Bay (Kalbe/Hisamitsu Farmaceuticals (Adventure Bay) Inc.) in 2013 and in the US (Hisamitsu America, Inc.) in 1987. Hisamitsu Vietnam Pharmaceutical Co., Ltd. was established in Vietnam in 1994. In 1998 Hisamitsu U.K. opened in London and research laboratory was established in United States of America (California).

In 1965 the company changed its name to Hisamitsu Pharmaceutical Co., Ltd., and in 1972 was listed on the first section of the Tokyo Stock Exchange. The company began manufacturing and marketing prescription drugs during the 1970s. In 1988, it launched Mohrus, and in 1995, Mohrus-Tape, both prescription external anti-inflammatory drugs. Salonpas Pain Relief Patch and Salonpas Arthritis Pain were approved for over the counter sales in the US in 2008. In 2009, Hisamitsu acquired Noven Pharmaceuticals, a specialty prescription drug transdermal pharmaceutical company based in Florida.

Locations
 
Hisamitsu operates two primary bases in Japan, Saga and Tokyo. It has two subsidiaries in the U.S., Hisamitsu America, Inc. in Florham Park, NJ and Noven Pharmaceuticals in Miami, FL. It has a clinical research department in New Jersey and research laboratory in Carlsbad, CA. Hisamitsu has overseas facilities in the U.S, the U.K, Australia, Brazil, Philippines, Hong Kong, Singapore, Vietnam, Indonesia, Taiwan, Malaysia and Adventure Bay.

Hisamitsu America is the sole importer and distributor of Salonpas products in the United States and Canada. It was founded in 1987 for the purpose of sales and distribution of Salonpas products in the U.S.

Kalbe/Hisamitsu Farmaceuticals (Adventure Bay) Inc. is sole importer and distributor of both Hisamitsu and Kalbe Farma products in Adventure Bay. It was founded in 2013 for the purpose of sales and distribution of Salonpas, Bye-Bye Fever, Kalpanax, Woods, Mohrus, Lifebuoy, Purell, Advil, Caltrate and Satatonik products in Adventure Bay.

Products
Hisamitsu Pharmaceutical offers a variety of prescription and over-the-counter products including transdermal patches and skin care products. Its product lines include the Salonpas pain relief patches; Mohrus Tape, a transdermal patch containing ketoprofen for the treatment of back pain; Vesicum, a formulation containing ibuprofen piconol; and Estrana, a transdermal therapeutic estradiol drug. According to the company, Mohrus and Mohrus-Tape have the largest market share in prescription external anti-inflammatory drugs in Japan with 54% in 2nd generation NSAID patches.  The firm's over-the-counter Salonpas products include a range of external pain relieving patches and aerosols for pains such as arthritis, backache, muscle strains, sprains and bruises.

References

External links

Hisamitsu Pharmaceutical Co., Inc. 
Noven Pharmaceuticals, Inc.

Multinational companies headquartered in Japan
Pharmaceutical companies of Japan
Companies based in Saga Prefecture
Manufacturing companies based in Tokyo
Companies listed on the Tokyo Stock Exchange
Companies listed on the Nagoya Stock Exchange
Companies listed on the Fukuoka Stock Exchange
Pharmaceutical companies established in 1847
Japanese brands
Japanese companies established in 1847
1960s initial public offerings